Artur Hovhannisyan (Arthur Oganesyan) may refer to:

Arthur Hovhannisyan (karateka) (born 1975), Armenian karateka
Arthur Hovhannisyan (footballer) (born 1968), with Shirak F.C.; see 2002 FIFA World Cup qualification – UEFA Group 5
Artur Hovhannisyan (boxer) (born 1996), Armenian boxer

See also
Hovhannisyan, a surname